Lake Geneva is a major European lake between Switzerland and France. 

Lake Geneva may also refer to:


Places
 Lake Geneva, Alberta, Canada, a locality

United States
 Lake Geneva, Florida, an unincorporated community
 Lake Geneva (Minnesota), a lake in Douglas County
 Lake Geneva, Wisconsin, a city
 Geneva Lake, a lake in Walworth County, Wisconsin

Other uses
 USS Lake Geneva (ID-4215-B)), a United States Navy cargo ship

See also
 
 Geneva (disambiguation)